Salah Uddin Shoaib Choudhury is a Bangladeshi journalist and the editor of the Bangladeshi newspaper 'Blitz'. Choudhury has faced a number of criminal charges against him including smuggling information out of the country, fraud, sedition, treason, blasphemy, and espionage.

Controversy and imprisonment
Salah Uddin Shoaib Choudhury was arrested on 29 November 2003 when he tried to attend a seminar in Tel Aviv at the invitation of the International Forum for the Literature and Culture of Peace. He was charged with smuggling country information, sedition, treason and blasphemy in 2003, and a case was filed against him on 24 January 2004 by Mohammad Abdul Hanif, head of Airport Police Station of Dhaka, who claimed that he was a Mossad agent based on the documents found in his possession. On 9 January 2014, he was convicted by a Dhaka court of sedition under section 505 (A) of Bangladesh's Penal Code.

In March 2011, Aryeh Yosef Gallin, founder and president of the Root and Branch Association (a nonprofit group that promotes co-operation between Israel and other nations), expelled Choudhury from its Islam-Israel Fellowship after reports surfaced that the Bangladeshi had swindled "emotionally vulnerable single Jewish ladies" out of tens of thousands of dollars.

On 7 November 2012, the Dhaka court sent Choudhury to jail in connection to an embezzlement case filed by his business partner Sajjad Hossain, chairman of Bangladesh Center for International Studies. He was convicted in 2015 by the Chief Metropolitan Magistrate court and sentenced to four years of rigorous imprisonment.

In 2014, Salah Uddin Shoaib Choudhury was convicted and sentenced to 7 years of imprisonment by the Bangladeshi court.

Treason charges
Choudhury faced charges of smuggling information out of country, money fraud, sedition, treason, blasphemy, and espionage since January 2004 for attempting to attend a conference of the Hebrew Writers' Association in Tel Aviv. He violated the Passport Act by attempting to travel to Israel in November 2003; the Act forbids citizens from visiting countries with which Bangladesh does not maintain diplomatic relations, and is usually punishable with a fine. On 29 November, he was taken into police custody and allegedly blindfolded, beaten and interrogated for ten days in an attempt to extract a confession that he was an Israeli spy. He spent the next 17 months in solitary confinement and was denied medical treatment for his glaucoma. On the intervention of US Congressman Mark Kirk, who spoke to Bangladesh's ambassador to the US, Choudhury was released on bail, though the charges were not dropped.

Assaults 
In October 2006, a mob stormed the Weekly Blitz offices and beat Choudhury, fracturing his ankle. According to Bret Stephens, a columnist for The Wall Street Journal, in September of the same year, despite the government's reluctance to prosecute, a judge with Islamist connections ordered the case to continue because Choudhury had "spoil[ed] the image of Bangladesh" and "hurt the sentiments of Muslims" by lauding Jews and Christians. After the police detail that had been posted to the offices had left, the offices were ransacked and Choudhury was badly beaten by a mob. When he lodged a formal complaint with the police, an arrest warrant was issued for him. The US Embassy in Dhaka sent an observer to his trial.

Choudhury later lodged a case in the Court of Metropolitan Magistrate against his attackers, most of whom were affiliated with the Cultural Wing of the Bangladesh Nationalist Party (BNP).

On 18 March 2008, members of Rapid Action Battalion (RAB) abducted Choudhury from his office at gunpoint. He was blindfolded and taken to an RAB office before being released. Series of written complaints were sent with the military-controlled interim government on this incident, but action was never taken by the Bangladesh authorities against the RAB.

On 22 February 2009, armed men claiming to belong to the Awami League entered Choudhury's office, ransacked it, and physically assaulted him and other members of the Weekly Blitz newspaper. The Weekly Blitz

Choudhury is the editor and owner of the English language newspaper Weekly Blitz, and editor-in-chief of Bangla weekly Jamjamat. Weekly Blitz is a tabloid which has been published every Wednesday since 2003 by Choudhury.

The tabloid proclaims that it watches, investigates, and focuses on Islamist militancy groups; and defends religious minority groups in Bangladesh.

In July 2006, the office of this newspaper was bombed by Islamist militants.

In March 2008, members of the Rapid Action Battalion raided the office of Weekly Blitz and arrested its editor from the office; the editor was released after several hours.

Impact 
Choudhury's journalism influenced the Bangladesh government policy and popular opinion, and it prompted the Bangladeshi government to ban the Islamist group Hizb-ut Tahrir and the antisemitic publication Dajjal, which is published by another Islamist militancy group, Hizbut Towhid. A campaign against Zakir Naik led Britain and Canada to refuse him entry.

Support for Choudhury 
The campaign to get the government of Bangladesh to drop all charges against Choudhury was led by Dr. Richard Benkin. Benkin, like Choudhury, is an advisory board member of the Islam-Israel Fellowship.

The European Parliament made a Motion for Resolution on 14 November 2006, in defense of Choudhury.

Other entities around the globe that showed support for Choudhury and his ideals include the Parliament of Australia, the Italian Muslim Association, the International Society For Human Rights, the American Jewish Committee, and the Overseas Press Club of America.

US House Resolution 64 
House Resolution 64, introduced by Representatives Mark Kirk (R-IL) and Nita Lowey (D-NY), called on the government of Bangladesh to drop all charges against Choudhury, who was charged with sedition for writing pro-Israel reports. The vote on the resolution was held on 13 March 2007 and the resolution passed by a vote of 409 to 1, with 4 members voting present. The house also noted charge against  Choudhury engaging in fraud activities.

Views on Islam 
Choudhury rejects the assertion by Geert Wilders that there are moderate Muslims, but no moderate Islam: "My Islam derives from the Koran. This teaches that Muslims, Jews and Christians will all be rewarded for good deeds and punished for evil."

Inqilab Television 

Choudhury was the managing director of Inqilab Television, a private television venture run by the Daily Inqilab, and was also a correspondent for the newspaper. But he was dismissed from ITV(Inqilab Television) on charges of graft. He claims his ownership share in the station was sold without his consent. In a court appearance, Choudhury claimed that his arrest was motivated by the financial dispute over his ownership stake in Inqilab Television.

Publications 
His book Injustice & Jihad was published in 2007. In 2008, the Italian publishing house Neftasia published Choudhury's book titled Non Sono Colpevole (I Am Not Guilty) in Italian.

He was interviewed in a documentary titled America at Risk, which was produced by Citizens United Productions, in the United States.

Inside Madrassa, in which Choudhury wrote about madrasas and Islamic education, was published in 2009.

Choudhury opened a branch of the Israel-based International Forum for Literature and Culture of Peace. He wrote about the rise of al-Qaeda in Bangladesh and has written articles critical of anti-Zionist and antisemitic attitudes in Muslim-majority countries.

Published works 
Choudhury has written a number of books in Bengali, English, and Italian.

References

External links
 https://www.ucanews.com/news/editor-jailed-over-aborted-israel-trip-10-years-ago/70046#

Bangladeshi journalists
Bangladeshi Zionists
Human rights in Bangladesh
Muslim supporters of Israel
1960s births
Living people